Fanuel is a given name. Notable people with the given name include:

Fanuel Kenosi (born 1988), Botswana sprinter
Fanuel Kozonguizi (1932-1995), Namibian lawyer and politician
Fanuel Magangani, Malawaian Anglican bishop
Fanuel Makamu (born 1977), South African robber, rapist and serial killer
Fanuel Massingue (born 1982), Mozambican footballer